The Subcommittee on Terrorism and Illicit Finance is a subcommittee of the United States House Committee on Financial Services.

Members, 115th Congress

External links
Official website

Subcommittees of the United States House of Representatives